Yawhen Zuew (born 2 March 1983) is a Belarusian former professional footballer. His latest club was Vitebsk.

Honours
Naftan Novopolotsk
Belarusian Cup winner: 2008–09

Gomel
Belarusian Cup winner: 2010–11

External links

1983 births
Living people
Belarusian footballers
Association football forwards
FC SKVICH Minsk players
FC Torpedo-BelAZ Zhodino players
FC Vitebsk players
FC Naftan Novopolotsk players
FC Gomel players
FC Slavia Mozyr players